Hohenbergia is a genus of plants in the family Bromeliaceae, subfamily Bromelioideae. It is native to the West Indies, the Yucatán Peninsula, and northern South America (Colombia, Venezuela, Brazil).

The genus name is named after Duke Paul Wilhelm of Württemberg, a German botanist and patron of botany who travelled to the Americas under the alias of Baron of Hohenberg.  This genus has two recognized subgenera: the type subgenus and Wittmackiopsis Mez.  Recent DNA studies have shown the two subgenera are not monophyletic, and the species of subg. Wittmackiopsis have been transferred to the resurrected genus Wittmackia.

Species
 Hohenbergia abbreviata L.B. Smith & Proctor - Jamaica
 Hohenbergia aechmeoides Leme - Paraíba
 Hohenbergia andina Betancur - Colombia
 Hohenbergia antillana Mez - Puerto Rico, Virgin Islands
 Hohenbergia arcuata Leme & M.Machado - Bahia
 Hohenbergia augusta (Vellozo) E. Morren - SE Brazil from Espírito Santo to Santa Catarina
 Hohenbergia barbarespina Leme & Fraga - Bahia
 Hohenbergia belemii L.B. Smith & R.W. Read - Bahia
 Hohenbergia blanchetii (Baker) E. Morren ex Mez - E Brazil from Pernambuco to Espírito Santo
 Hohenbergia brachycephala L.B. Smith - Bahia
 Hohenbergia brittoniana L.B. Smith - Jamaica
 Hohenbergia burle-marxii Leme & W. Till  - Bahia
 Hohenbergia capitata Schult. & Schult.f.  - E Brazil from Bahia to Espírito Santo
 Hohenbergia castellanosii L.B. Smith & R.W. Read - Bahia
 Hohenbergia catingae Ule Brazil (Minas Gerais, Bahia, Pernambuco, Paraíba)
 Hohenbergia caymanensis Britton ex L.B. Smith - Grand Cayman
 Hohenbergia conquistensis Leme  - Bahia
 Hohenbergia correia-araujoi E. Pereira & Moutinho  - Bahia
 Hohenbergia distans (Grisebach) Baker in Saunders - Jamaica
 Hohenbergia edmundoi L.B. Smith & R.W. Read - Bahia
 Hohenbergia eriantha (Brongniart ex Baker) Mez - Pernambuco
 Hohenbergia eriostachya Mez  - Jamaica
 Hohenbergia estevesii E. Pereira & Moutinho - Bahia
 Hohenbergia fawcettii Mez - Jamaica
 Hohenbergia flava Leme & Paula - Bahia
 Hohenbergia gnetacea Mez  - Jamaica
 Hohenbergia hatschbachii Leme - Bahia
 Hohenbergia humilis L.B. Smith & R.W. Read  - Bahia
 Hohenbergia igatuensis Leme - Bahia
 Hohenbergia inermis Mez - Jamaica
 Hohenbergia itamarajuensis Leme & Baracho - Bahia
 Hohenbergia jamaicana L.B. Smith & Proctor - Jamaica
 Hohenbergia laesslei L.B. Smith - Jamaica
 Hohenbergia lanata E. Pereira & Moutinho - Bahia
 Hohenbergia lemei H. Luther & K. Norton - Bahia
 Hohenbergia leopoldo-horstii E. Gross, Rauh & Leme - Bahia
 Hohenbergia littoralis L.B. Smith - Bahia
 Hohenbergia loredanoana Leme & L.Kollmann - Minas Gerais
 Hohenbergia magnispina Leme - Bahia
 Hohenbergia membranostrobilus Mez - Espírito Santo, Rio de Janeiro
 Hohenbergia mesoamericana I.Ramírez, Carnevali & Cetzal - Quintana Roo
 Hohenbergia minor L.B. Smith - Bahia
 Hohenbergia mutabilis Leme & L.Kollmann - Espírito Santo
 Hohenbergia negrilensis Britton ex L.B. Smith - Jamaica
 Hohenbergia oxoniensis W. Weber - eastern Brazil
 Hohenbergia pabstii L.B. Smith & R.W. Read - Bahia, Minas Gerais
 Hohenbergia penduliflora (A. Richard) Mez - Cuba, Jamaica
 Hohenbergia pennae E. Pereira - Bahia
 Hohenbergia polycephala (Baker) Mez - Jamaica
 Hohenbergia portoricensis Mez - Puerto Rico
 Hohenbergia proctorii L.B. Smith - Jamaica
 Hohenbergia reconcavensis Leme & Fraga - Bahia
 Hohenbergia ridleyi (Baker) Mez - Paraíba, Pernambuco
 Hohenbergia rosea L.B. Smith & R.W. Read - Bahia
 Hohenbergia salzmannii (Baker) E. Morren ex Mez - Bahia
 Hohenbergia sandrae Leme - Bahia
 Hohenbergia spinulosa Mez - Jamaica
 Hohenbergia stellata Schult. & Schult.f. - Trinidad-Tobago, Martinique, Netherlands Antilles, Venezuela, Alagoas, Bahia, Piauí
 Hohenbergia undulatifolia Leme & H. Luther  - Bahia
 Hohenbergia urbaniana Mez - Jamaica
 Hohenbergia utriculosa Ule - Bahia
 Hohenbergia vestita L.B. Smith - Bahia

Cultivars
 Hohenbergia 'Maria Valentina'

References

External links
 BSI Genera Gallery photos
 US Department of Agriculture Article
 ITIS Report on Hohenbergia

 
Bromeliaceae genera